Kenneth Paul Hammond (born August 22, 1963) is a Canadian former professional ice hockey player. Hammond was born in Port Credit, Ontario (now Mississauga).

College hockey career
Hammond joined the RPI Engineers of Rensselaer Polytechnic Institute in the 1981-82 season, appearing in 24 games, scoring two goals and five points in his freshman season with the club. In 1982-83, Hammond improved his offensive production, as he scored four goals and 17 points in 28 games.

In 1983–84, Hammond was named captain of RPI. In 34 games, Hammond scored five goals and 16 points.

In his final season with RPI, Hammond led the team to the 1985 NCAA Division I Men's Ice Hockey Tournament championship. Hammond played in 38 games, scoring 11 goals and 39 points, and was named a First Team All-American and First Team All-NCAA Tournament team selection with Adam Oates, Darren Puppa, and John Carter.

Hammond completed his degree in civil engineering and later returned to achieve an M.B.A. in finance and accounting.

Professional career

Los Angeles Kings
Hammond was selected by the Los Angeles Kings in the eighth round, 147th overall, at the 1983 NHL Entry Draft held at the Montreal Forum in Montreal, Quebec.

Hammond made his NHL debut at the end of the 1984–85 season with the Kings. On April 5, 1985, Hammond scored his first career NHL goal and point, against Richard Brodeur of the Vancouver Canucks in a 4-3 victory. Overall, Hammond appeared in three games, scoring one goal. On April 10, Hammond appeared in his first career playoff game, a 3-2 loss to the Edmonton Oilers. He played in three post-season games with Los Angeles, earning no points.

Hammond was assigned to the New Haven Nighthawks of the American Hockey League (AHL) for the 1985–86 season. In 67 games with the Nighthawks, Hammond scored four goals and 16 points, and accumulated 96 penalty minutes, helping the club reach the playoffs. In four playoff games, Hammond was held off the score sheet. Hammond also appeared in three games with Los Angeles during the 1985–86 season, earning an assist.

In 1986–87, Hammond once again spent a majority of the season with the Nighthawks and in 66 games, he scored a goal and 16 points, plus one assist in six playoff games. Hammond also appeared in 10 games with the Kings in 1986–87, earning two assists.

Hammond began the 1987–88 season with New Haven. In 26 games, he scored three goals and 11 points. Hammond played in 46 games with Los Angeles, scoring seven goals and 16 points while getting 69 penalty minutes. On December 30, 1987, Hammond recorded his first multi-point NHL game, scoring a goal and an assist in a 6-4 win over the Winnipeg Jets. On February 6, 1988, Hammond had his first career multi-goal game, scoring two goals against the Edmonton Oilers in a 7-2 win. In the playoffs, Hammond played in two games, earning no points and a -5 rating. Hammond, along with Glenn Healy, were co-winners of the Kings Rookie of the Year Award.

On October 3, 1988, Hammond was placed on waivers and claimed by the Edmonton Oilers.

Edmonton, New York, Toronto
Hammond began the 1988–89 with the Edmonton Oilers, appearing in his first game with the team on October 8, 1989, earning no points in a 5-4 win over the Winnipeg Jets. On October 12, Hammond earned his first point as an Oiler, an assist on a goal scored by Jari Kurri in a 6-2 loss to the Vancouver Canucks. Overall, Hammond appeared in five games with Edmonton, earning one assist.

On November 1, 1988, Hammond was placed on waivers and claimed by the New York Rangers. Hammond debuted with the Rangers on November 2, 1988, as he was held pointless in a 6-4 loss to the Buffalo Sabres. After three games, in which Hammond did not earn a point, he was sent to the Rangers International Hockey League (IHL) affiliate, the Denver Rangers. In 38 games with Denver, Hammond scored five goals and 23 points.

On February 19, 1989, the Rangers traded Hammond to the Toronto Maple Leafs in exchange for Chris McRae. Hammond made his debut with the Maple Leafs on February 20, 1989 against the Kings in a 5-4 loss. Hammond earned his first point, an assist on a goal scored by Vincent Damphousse in a 4-2 win over the Minnesota North Stars on February 25. In total, Hammond played in 14 games with Toronto in 1988-89, earning two assists. 

In 1989–90, the Leafs assigned Hammond to their AHL affiliate, the Newmarket Saints. In 75 games with Newmarket, Hammond scored nine goals and 54 points while earning 106 penalty minutes.

On August 20, 1990, the Maple Leafs traded Hammond to the Boston Bruins for cash.

Boston, San Jose, Vancouver, Ottawa
Hammond was assigned by the Bruins to their AHL affiliate, the Maine Mariners, for the 1990–91 season. In 80 games with Maine, Hammond scored 10 goals and 51 points, and accumulated 159 penalty minutes. In two playoff games with the Mariners, Hammond had no points and 16 penalty minutes. Hammond also appeared in one game with the Bruins during the 1990–91 season. On March 31, 1991, Hammond made his only regular season appearance with Boston, scoring a goal against Kay Whitmore of the Hartford Whalers in a 7-3 win. It was Hammond's first goal in the NHL in over three years, as his previous goal was scored on March 5, 1988. Hammond then appeared in eight playoff games for Boston, earning no points.

Following the season, Hammond was granted free agency.

On August 9, 1991, Hammond signed with the expansion San Jose Sharks for the 1991–92 season.

Hammond played for the Sharks for their inaugural game on October 4, 1991, in which he was held pointless in a 4-3 loss to the Vancouver Canucks. On October 10, Hammond scored his first goal for the Sharks against Stephane Beauregard of the Winnipeg Jets in a 5-4 loss. On November 8, Hammond earned two assists in a 6-2 victory over the Edmonton Oilers. With the Sharks, Hammond played in 46 games, scoring five goals and 15 points, and earned 86 penalty minutes.

On March 9, 1992, Hammond was traded to the Vancouver Canucks for an eighth round draft pick in the 1992 NHL Entry Draft.

Hammond made his Canucks debut in the playoffs on May 10, 1992, earning no points and four penalty minutes in a 4-3 win over the Edmonton Oilers. In two playoff games for the Canucks, Hammond had no points and six penalty minutes.

On June 18, 1992, Hammond was claimed by the Ottawa Senators in the 1992 NHL Expansion Draft.

For the second time in two seasons, Hammond was on an expansion team, as he joined the Senators for the 1992–93. Hammond debuted with Ottawa during their inaugural game on October 8, 1992, and scored against Patrick Roy of the Montreal Canadiens in a 5-3 win. In 62 games with Ottawa, Hammond scored four goals and eight points, getting 104 penalty minutes, and finished with a -42 rating. Hammond also played in four games with the Senators AHL affiliate, the New Haven Senators, earning an assist.

Later career
Hammond signed with the Providence Bruins of the AHL for the 1993–94 season. In 65 games, he scored 12 goals and 57 points.

Hammond signed with the Kansas City Blades of the IHL for the 1994–95 season. In 76 games, Hammond scored three goals and 27 points, helping the club to the post-season. In 21 playoff games, Hammond had a goal and five points, as Kansas City lost in the final round of the Turner Cup playoffs.

Hammond returned to the Blades for the 1995–96 season. In 33 games, he scored a goal and eight points.

Following the season, Hammond announced his retirement.

Career statistics

Regular season and playoffs

Awards and honors

References

External links 

1963 births
Living people
AHCA Division I men's ice hockey All-Americans
Boston Bruins players
Canadian ice hockey defencemen
Denver Rangers players
Edmonton Oilers players
Ice hockey people from Ontario
Kansas City Blades players
Los Angeles Kings draft picks
Los Angeles Kings players
Maine Mariners players
NCAA men's ice hockey national champions
New Haven Nighthawks players
New Haven Senators players
New York Rangers players
Newmarket Saints players
Ottawa Senators players
Providence Bruins players
RPI Engineers men's ice hockey players
San Jose Sharks players
Sportspeople from Mississauga
Toronto Maple Leafs players
Vancouver Canucks players